The 1990 Southwest Conference women's basketball tournament was held March 7–10, 1990, at Moody Coliseum in Dallas, Texas. 

Number 1 seed  defeated 3 seed  63-60 to win their 8th championship and receive the conference's automatic bid to the 1990 NCAA tournament.

Format and seeding 
The tournament consisted of a 6 team single-elimination tournament. The top two seeds had a bye to the Semifinals.

Tournament

References 

Southwest Conference women's Basketball Tournament
1990 in American women's basketball
1990 in sports in Texas
Basketball in Dallas